The Cape Fear Heroes were a professional indoor football team based in Fayetteville, North Carolina. They last played in the American Arena League in 2019. The Heroes were owned by Barbara Spigner.

They began play in 2012 as an expansion member of American Indoor Football (AIF). The Heroes fared very well in their first three seasons of play, going to back-to-back-to-back AIF Championship Games, going undefeated in 2012. The Heroes finished as runner-up in 2013 and 2014. In 2015, it was announced that the Heroes would be leaving the AIF, and joining the X-League Indoor Football (X-League). In June 2015, the team's season was abruptly ended when they were suspended by the league.

They have won one conference title, in their only season playing in a conference, while finishing with the best regular season record in the AIF for three consecutive seasons. The Heroes played their home games at the Crown Coliseum.

History
The Heroes are the fourth arena/indoor football team to be based in Fayetteville, following the Cape Fear Wildcats of arenafootball2 (which played from 2002 until 2004 after which they to Albany, Georgia and became the South Georgia Wildcats), the Fayetteville Guard which played in the National Indoor Football League (2005–2007) and American Indoor Football Association (2008–2010), and the Fayetteville Force which only played in the Southern Indoor Football League for the 2011 season, after which both the Force and the SIFL folded.  Despite the AIF's purchase of the Force, the Heroes are considered a completely new franchise.

American Indoor Football: 2012–2014
The Cape Fear Heroes were founded as an expansion team in the 2012 American Indoor Football season by a partnership headed by Barbara Spigner. Jack Bowman, who was also the director of the league, also operated the Heroes as president and general manager, while Charles Gunnings was named the head coach. The Heroes went 7–0 during their inaugural regular season and defeated the California Eagles 79–27 in the AIF Championship Game.

In the 2013 season, Spigner became the sole owner of the team and the Heroes went 7–1 in the five-team league. The Heroes returned to the AIF championship game and fell to the Harrisburg Stampede 57–42.

Following the 2013 season, owner Barbara Spigner took over as general manager from Jack Bowman. In December, 2013, Spigner named Josh Resignalo the team's head coach. The team finished as the top seed in the 2014 regular season and appeared in their third-straight championship game, losing to the Baltimore Mariners.

X-League: 2015
On July 31, 2014, the Cape Fear Heroes announced that they have joined the X-League Indoor Football (X-League). After falling to 4–4, it was announced that the X-League had suspended the Heroes for the remainder of the season for not being in good standing with the leagues rules. Just days later, the Heroes announced that they would be leaving the X-League entirely and operating independently the rest of the season.

2016: Suspension of operations
On August 23, 2015, it was announced that the Heroes would be the charter member of Supreme Indoor Football (SIF), one of the two leagues (along with the Continental Indoor Football League) which comprises the Indoor Football Alliance. However, after the CIFL effectively disbanded in January 2016 when the Erie Explosion (the last remaining CIFL team) announced they would take the season off and only one of the SIF's teams (the Buffalo Lightning) were ready to play a 2016 season, the Heroes announced that it would sit out the 2016 season on March 3.

SIF and AAL: 2017–2019
Heroes' owner Barbara Spigner again relaunched Supreme Indoor Football (SIF) as a league with the Heroes as one of the charter members. They went on to win the championship against the previously undefeated Triangle Torch. During the offseason, many of the SIF members joined the newly formed American Arena League (AAL). On August 23, 2017, the Heroes also announced they would be joining the new league.

During their second season in the AAL, owner Barbara Spigner had health issues and had to step down from team operations. The team then suspended operations before the 2020 season. All team websites have since gone defunct.

Statistics

Season-by-season results

Head coaches' records
Note: Statistics are correct through the end of the 2019 American Arena League season.

References

External links
 Official website

Supreme Indoor Football teams
Indoor Football Alliance teams
Sports in Fayetteville, North Carolina
American football teams in North Carolina
American football teams  established in 2011
Former American Indoor Football teams
Former X-League Indoor Football teams
2011 establishments in North Carolina